"Cold as You" is a song by American country music singer Luke Combs, It was released on July 19, 2021, as the seventh single from the deluxe edition of his second studio album What You See Is What You Get. The song was co-written by Randy Montana, Shane Minor, Jonathan Singleton and Combs, who also produced the track with Singleton and Chip Matthews.

Background
On October 5, 2020, Combs uploaded an acoustic rendition of "Cold as You" and dedicated it to his parents, wife and fans.

Content
"Cold as You" was described by Outsider as a "story of a broken-hearted guy finding his way to a barstool".

Music video
The music video was uploaded on August 25, 2021, and was directed by TA Films. It showcases a man through a night after he escapes his ex-girlfriend and her new lover via a secret door in the back of a jukebox in a nostalgic diner. In addition to the couple featured in the "Hurricane" music video, other supporting actors make cameos in the music video as the characters from other of Combs' music videos, including the grandfather and granddaughter from "Forever After All", childhood versions of Combs and his wife, Nicole, from "Lovin' on You", and the rejected proposer and his bartender from "Beer Never Broke My Heart".

Live performance
Combs performed the song at the 2020 CMA Awards and 2021 CMT Music Awards.

Charts

Weekly charts

Year-end charts

Release history

References

2020 songs
2021 singles
Luke Combs songs
Songs written by Luke Combs
Songs written by Randy Montana
Songs written by Jonathan Singleton
Songs written by Shane Minor
Columbia Nashville Records singles